Dakhali is a village in Kahuta Tehsil in the Punjab province of Pakistan.

KIT College Kahuta also situated in area of Dakhali

Populated places in Kahuta Tehsil
Union councils of Kahuta Tehsil